John David Frechette (December 19, 1942 – July 29, 2014) was a tackle in the National Football League.

Frechette was born John David Frechette on December 19, 1942, in Waltham, Massachusetts.

He played with the Boston Patriots and Green Bay Packers each for a season. He played at the collegiate level at Boston College.

After football, Frechette worked for Roadway Express and Owens-Illinois.  He was on the board of trustees for the University of Toledo Medical Center and Toledo Cultural Arts Center during the 1990s.

Frechette died on July 29, 2014, in hospice care facility in Naples, Florida from complications of Alzheimer's disease.  He was 71.

See also
List of Green Bay Packers players
List of New England Patriots players

References

Sportspeople from Waltham, Massachusetts
Green Bay Packers players
New England Patriots players
American football offensive tackles
Boston College Eagles football players
1942 births
2014 deaths